William Enlow Amos (July 6, 1898 – April 26, 1987) was an American college football player and coach. He is considered to be one of the best college football players in Washington & Jefferson College history.

Amos was born in Graysville, Pennsylvania. He attended The Kiski School and was a veteran of World War I.

As a fullback for Washington & Jefferson for was named to the 1926 College Football All-America Team and the 1927 College Football All-America Team.

After graduation, he turned down an offer from Pete Henry to play for the New York Giants and a minor league baseball contract. He returned to coach the Washington & Jefferson College football team from 1929 to 1931, amassing a record of 17–8–3. During the 1929 football season, Amos shared the head coach title with Ray Ride, who resigned after the season citing it being impossible to operate under dual authority. From 1937 through 1946, he was a multi-sport coach at Washington High School. He was a driving force in the creation of PONY Baseball and Softball. He also volunteered at the Brownson House.

In 1932, Amos was seriously injured in an automobile collision, sustaining a fractured skull and broken left arm.

He married Dora Polan in 1928 and with her had three children. Amos died in 1987 at the age of 88. Dora died the following year.

Head coaching record

College

References

External links
 

1898 births
1987 deaths
American football fullbacks
Grove City Wolverines football coaches
Washington & Jefferson Presidents football coaches
Washington & Jefferson Presidents football players
High school football coaches in Pennsylvania
The Kiski School alumni
People from Greene County, Pennsylvania
Coaches of American football from Pennsylvania
Players of American football from Pennsylvania